Contactins are a subgroup of molecules belonging to the immunoglobulin superfamily that are expressed exclusively in the nervous system. These proteins are attached to the neuronal membrane by a GPI-anchor. The subgroup consists of six members now referred to as contactin 1-6, but historically they had different names as shown in the table below:

References

Cell adhesion molecules
GPI-Linked proteins